The Acer N series is a line of PDAs produced by Acer for the Pocket PC 2002 operating system and its successors over the period 2003 to 2005. 

The newer models are ones from the n300 series – Acer n310 and Acer n311. The Acer N series is well known for the USB hosts in the newer models.

By the time of the introduction of the later models smartphones were thought to beginning to make significant in-roads into the market for PDAs.

References

N series
Windows Mobile Classic devices